Daiopterix is an extinct genus of moth within the family Eolepidopterigidae, containing two species. Daiopterix rasnitsyni is known from Kazakhstan. The fossil remains date from the Jurassic.

The second species, Daiopterix olgae, is known from the Glushkova Formation in central Siberia. It dates from the Jurassic-Cretaceous boundary, about 145 million years ago.

References

Eolepidopterigoidea
Fossil Lepidoptera
Jurassic insects
Jurassic insects of Asia